Wyman W. Webb is a Canadian judge serving on the Federal Court of Appeal since 2012.

References

Living people
Schulich School of Law alumni
Judges of the Federal Court of Appeal (Canada)
Year of birth missing (living people)